Lorenzo Michelini (Borgosesia, 2 January 2000) is an Italian rugby union player.
His usual position is as a Prop and he currently plays for Calvisano in Top12.

In 2019 and 2020, Michelini was named in the Italy Under 20 squad.

References 

It's Rugby England Profile
Ultimate Rugby Profile
ESPN Profile

2000 births
Living people
Sportspeople from the Province of Vercelli
Italian rugby union players
Rugby union flankers